The Nationale Masculine 1, abbreviated as NM1, (English: National Male 1), is the professional level third-tier division of men's club basketball in France. The two top teams from each season of the competition are promoted to the LNB Pro B, which is the French second division. The competition is organized by the French Basketball Federation (FFBB).

Seasons

References

3 
Third level basketball leagues in Europe